(The Sunken Bell) is an opera in four acts by Italian composer Ottorino Respighi. Its libretto is by Claudio Guastalla, based on the play Die versunkene Glocke by German author Gerhart Hauptmann. The opera's premiere was on 18 November 1927 in Hamburg, Germany. Respighi's regular publisher, Ricordi, was displeased by his choice of subject, and refused to publish the opera. This led to its being published by the German publisher Bote & Bock, and a German premiere.

The fairy-tale world of Hauptmann's play inspired Respighi to create his most lavishly and imaginatively orchestrated operatic score, which frequently reminds the listener of his famous symphonic poems. Since the opera's anti-hero Enrico is a bell maker, Respighi fills the music with many chiming and ringing effects.

Roles

Instrumentation
La campana sommersa is scored for the following instruments:

3 flutes (3 doubling on piccolo), 2 oboes, English horn, 2 clarinets, bass clarinet, 2 bassoons, 4 horns, 3 trumpets, 2 tenor trombones, bass trombone, bass tuba, timpani, bass drum, handbells, cymbals, tam-tam, triangle, Basque drum, xylophone, anvils and drum sticks, harp, celesta, organ, bell, strings.

Synopsis

Act 1
Enrico, a bell maker, has built a bell for a new church, but the Faun has thrown it to the bottom of a lake. Enrico falls into despair. Overwhelmed with compassion, Rautendelein, an elf, decides to enter the human world. The water spirit Ondino tries in vain to dissuade her.

Act 2
Enrico is overwhelmed by the misfortune, and his wife Magda worries that he would never work again. Rautendelein, in the form of a little girl believed to be dumb, is introduced to the family by a priest to help Magda. Her presence manages to magically bring back Enrico's strength and vigor.

Act 3
Enrico and Rautendelein fall in love. Enrico abandons Magda, and even intends to found a new religion, for which he is designing a temple. In vain the priest tries to dissuade him: "It is easier that the bell submerged at the bottom of the lake rings", replies Enrico. Magda, distraught, kills herself by jumping into the lake. As his children announce the tragedy, the tolling of the bell from underwater is heard. Enrico, horrified, abandons Rautendelein.

Act 4
Rautendelein has now become the wife of Ondino. Enrico, close to death, meets a witch who grants his wish to see Rautendelein for a final time. She appears to him "as white as the Angel of Death". At first, she pretends not to recognize him, then answering to his pleas, kisses him gently as he dies.

Recordings

References

External links

Operas
Italian-language operas
1927 operas
Operas by Ottorino Respighi
Operas based on plays